Masayasu Maeda (born 10 March 1914, date of death unknown) was a Japanese basketball player. He competed in the men's tournament at the 1936 Summer Olympics.

References

External links
 

1914 births
Year of death missing
Place of birth missing
Japanese men's basketball players
Olympic basketball players of Japan
Basketball players at the 1936 Summer Olympics